Oberstadion is a town in the district of Alb-Donau in Baden-Württemberg in Germany.

It contains the following districts: Oberstadion, Hundersingen, Mundeldingen, Moosbeuren, Mühlhausen und Rettighofen.

References

Alb-Donau-Kreis
Württemberg